Fresh TV Inc. (formerly Fresh Animation) is a Canadian production company specializing in family entertainment aimed at preteens and teenagers, headquartered in Toronto, Ontario. Shows that have been broadcast internationally include Stoked, 6teen, and the Total Drama franchise. They expanded their focus to include live-action, with My Babysitter's a Vampire, Really Me, and Backstage.

Fresh TV’s sister company, Elliott Animation Inc., is an internationally recognized 2D and 3D animation studio based in Toronto.

Productions
Total Drama (since 2007)
6teen (seasons 3–4; 2007–2010; co-production with Nelvana)
Stoked (2009–2013)
My Babysitter's a Vampire (2010)
My Babysitter's a Vampire (2011–2012)
Really Me (2011–2013)
Grojband (2013–2015)
Bunks (2013)
Total Drama Presents: The Ridonculous Race (2015)
Backstage (2016–2017)
Total DramaRama (2018–2022)
Lucas the Spider (2021–present)

References

External links
 

Companies based in Toronto
Mass media companies established in 2004
Television production companies of Canada
2004 establishments in Ontario